Jakob Heller (c. 1460 — 28 January 1522) was a German patrician, politician, and merchant. He was born and died in Frankfurt am Main, and served as Senior Bürgermeister of the Free City of Frankfurt in 1501 and 1513. Heller is best remembered today as a patron of the arts, as he commissioned the Heller Altarpiece from Albrecht Dürer and Matthias Grünewald, and a large sculpture of the crucifixion from Hans Backoffen.

Further reading 
 Wolfgang Klötzer (ed.), Frankfurter Biographie. Erster Band A-L, Frankfurt am Main, Verlag Waldemar Kramer, 1994, 
 Wolfgang Schmid, "Jakob Heller als Stifter und Auftraggeber", in: Grünewald und seine Zeit. Karlsruhe 2007, pp. 48–57
 

German politicians
1460s births
1522 deaths